Otto Edler von Graeve (22 July 1872 – 10 January 1948) was a German divining rod proponent.

Biography
He was born on 22 July 1872 to Emil Edler von Graeve (1826–1904), lord of Gotteswalde and Neuhof. Otto von Graeve served in the Prussian army, achieving the rank of Major before he settled in the small town of Gernrode in Anhalt. In 1913, he published a manuscript on dowsing,  (My dowsing activity: Observations in theory and practice along with an appendix acknowledgments, minutes of all excavations to December 31, 1912 and statistics).

He visited the United States on 27 January 1914 aboard the USS George Washington, passing through New York City on his way to Vancouver Island to divine for radium. He also spent time dowsing in the Sinai Peninsula and in Palestine. The Deutsche Levante-Zeitung reported in November 1915 that von Graeve had dowsed for water at the German temple colony, on the property of the Auguste Viktoria Foundation on the Mount of Olives and on that of a Syrian orphanage.

In 1918, von Graeve is said to have found a mineral spring on the Schwedderberg near Gernrode, allegedly by using a divining rod, which was then used for the local outdoor pool. The town of Gernrode then had three bathing establishments, namely the Osterteich, the Schraderbad and the Ottobad, the latter discovered by and named after von Graeve.

Because of his reported successes, in 1920 he was commissioned by the city of Reutlingen to assist with drilling for a water source. After drilling in vain to a depth of 126 meters at the site von Graeve had indicated, he was expelled from the site.

Von Graeve married Elsbeth Schrey on 1 April 1902 in Danzig and they had seven children (four sons and three daughters).

Graeve's explanation of dowsing 
In 1914, as part of an interview and demonstration given to The Sun in New York von Graeve explained dowsing as follows:

He demonstrated his dowsing by detecting a gold 10-mark coin which he placed first on the carpet and then on a chair. He used a bent iron rod and when he approached the coin the "rod whipped over and struck his safety belt a hard thump." When a visitor attempted the same feat nothing happened. When the visitor held one end of the rod and von Graeve the other the rod bent towards the coin but not as violently as before.

The motion of such dowsing devices is generally attributed to the ideomotor phenomenon, a psychological response where a subject makes motions unconsciously. The scientific evidence is that dowsing is no more effective than random chance and it therefore regarded as a pseudoscience.

Von Graeve also detected the presence of what he believed to be water pipes within the second floor of the building in which the interview took place. Whether there was anything there or whether the pipes were electrical conduit was not confirmed.

During the interview von Graeve also claimed to have done 402 dowsings with a 93.12% success rate.

Publications
 Bestätigungen über erfolgreiche Schürfungen vermittelst der Wünschelrute des Rutengängers [Confirmations of successful prospecting are given by the dowser's dowsing rod] (1911)
 
 
 Hildesheim (1914)
 Behörden und Wünschelrute [Authorities and dowsing] (1921)
 Auszug aus den Erfolgen meiner Wünschelrutentätigkeit von 1910 bis 1928 [Excerpt from the successes of my dowsing activity from 1910 to 1928] Padelt, Gernrode (1928)

References

Dowsing
Edlers of Germany
1872 births
1948 deaths
20th-century German writers
20th-century German male writers